Tianlian (Simplified Chinese: 天链, Traditional Chinese: 天鏈, English: Sky Link) also known as CTDRS, is a Chinese data relay communication satellite constellation. The constellation serves to relay data from ground stations to spacecraft and rockets, most significantly China's crewed spaceflight program. The system currently consists of seven satellites in two generations, with the first satellite being launched in 2008.

Mission 
Tianlian is used to provide real-time communications between orbiting satellites and ground control stations. The Chinese tracking and data relay satellites were developed by the China Academy of Space Technology (CAST) and it is similar to the American Tracking and Data Relay Satellite System (TDRSS) in concept. The system is designed to support near-real-time communications between orbiting spacecraft and ground control, as well as complement the ground-based space tracking and telemetry stations and ships in tracking spacecraft. This is necessary because ground stations can only maintain contact with a satellite while it is overhead. Positioning multiple satellites in geostationary orbit ensures that the ground station and satellite are both always in view of at least one relay satellite, allowing for constant communication between the ground station and target satellite. The system provides data relay services for crewed Shenzhou missions, from Shenzhou 7 onwards, the Tiangong space station, and interplanetary missions. All satellites were launched from the Xichang Satellite Launch Center and operate in geostationary orbit.

Tianlian I 
Tianlian I consists of five satellites, all based on the DFH-3 satellite bus. The first satellite of the series, Tianlian I-01, was launched on the maiden flight of the Long March 3C launch vehicle on 25 April 2008. With the launch of Tianlian I-03, a spacecraft could be tracked for 70% of its orbit, compared to only 15% without the constellation.

Tianlian II 
Tianlian II is the second generation of the constellation and currently consists of 3 satellites based on the DFH-4 satellite bus. The second generation system greatly improves data transmission rates and its multi-targeting ability. This in turn improves spacecraft operational safety and flexibility.

Satellites

See also 

 Queqiao - Chinese Data Relay satellite for lunar communication
 Chinese Deep Space Network - Mission control for deep space missions
 Tracking and Data Relay Satellite System - US equivalent
 Luch - Russian equivalent
 Indian Data Relay Satellite System - Indian equivalent
 European Data Relay System - ESA equivalent
 Inter-satellite service
 Shenzhou spacecraft

References 

Satellites orbiting Earth
2008 in spaceflight
2019 in spaceflight
Shenzhou 7
Shenzhou program
Communications satellites in geostationary orbit
Communications satellite constellations
Communications satellites of China
Spacecraft launched in 2008
Spacecraft launched in 2019
Inter-satellite communications satellites
Spacecraft launched by Long March rockets